"Doom Dada" (Korean:둠 다다) is a song recorded by the South Korean singer and rapper T.O.P, released as a single via YG Entertainment on November 15, 2013. It was written by T.O.P, who also composed the track with Choice37.

Release
"Doom Dada" was released digitally on November 15, 2013. The announcement was made through YG Entertainment‘s official website, with a teaser picture showing the rapper riding a motorcycle with a slightly creepy giant baby in the motorcycle side car. On December 13, a physical single album was released, including a CD with "Doom Dada" and its instrumental, unreleased music video making videos and a photobook made up of making of scenes.

Music video
Mirroring the video of his previous single, "Turn It Up", "Doom Dada" is also shot in black and white. The music video for "Doom Dada" was directed by Seo Hyun-seung. The music video references the Stanley Kubrick's movie 2001: A Space Odyssey. In a scene, there are apes who find a bone and start experimenting with it. In the movie, it shows the evolution of the human race, but in T.O.P's case as it's a microphone, it's showing the evolution of him as a rapper. Another inspiration for the video was the surrealist artist Salvador Dalí. T.O.P wears an upside down mustache, designed in the same way as Dalí's. Additionally, two of the artist's painting are parodied in the video: Baby Map of the World and The Three Sphinxes of Bikini. T.O.P stated that he "wanted to make a unique video that looks like a cult film with some fun elements, a video with a message. I wanted a lot of people to easily visualize the story behind the video."

Critical reception
"Doom Dada" earned the #1 position on Dazed magazine's Top 10 K-Pop tracks of 2013, with the magazine describing the track as "unexpected and, from a pop standpoint, virtually impenetrable on the first go", adding that the "lyrical rhythms are both inviting and alienating, while the beats align to trap and M.I.A's jagged tribalism. But go deeper and recognisable cadences reveal themselves.... it's K-Pop but sly, frenetic and slippery." Dazed concluded that, with this song, T.O.P was leading the evolution of K-Pop. Billboard praised the song, noting how the "melody is magnetizing with its whirring synths, tribal beats, and chanting, all of which pale in comparison to the rapper’s aggressive, multi-tonal delivery of his verses," and felt that T.O.P "revealed his true artistry" with this song.

Track listing

Charts and sales

Sales

Release history

References

External links
Music Video
 Official Website

2013 singles
2013 songs
T.O.P songs
YG Entertainment singles
Korean-language songs
Songs written by T.O.P